The Arado Ar 65 was the single-seat biplane fighter successor to the Ar 64. Both looked very similar. The only major difference was the use of a 12-cylinder inline engine versus the Ar 64's radial. The wingspan was also increased.

The Ar 65 appeared in 1931 and six models were built. The first three 65a-c were prototypes, while the 65d-f were production models. The Ar 65d was delivered in 1933 and served alongside the Ar 64 in the two fighter groups - Fliegergruppe Döberitz and Fliegergruppe Damm. In 1935, the Ar 65 was reduced to a training aircraft. Production of the fighter was discontinued in 1936. However, the next year, 12 of them were presented to Germany's ally - the Royal Bulgarian Air Force. The final production total was 85 aircraft.

Variants
Ar 65a Prototype, powered by a 559 kW (750 hp) BMW VI 7.3 12-cylinder water-cooled engine. First flight in 1931.
Ar 65b Prototype, similar to the 65a but with minor structural changes.
Ar 65c Prototype, similar to the 65b but with minor structural changes.
Ar 65d Production model.
Ar 65E Similar to the 65d, but with the removal of the vertical fuselage magazine of six 10 kg (22 lb) bombs.
Ar 65F Final production model. Similar to the 65E.

Operators

Bulgarian Air Force

Luftwaffe

Specifications (Ar 65E)

See also

References

Bibliography
Green, William, and Gordon Swanborough, The Complete Book of Fighters (Salamander Books, 2002)

Biplanes
Single-engined tractor aircraft
Arado Ar 065
Ar 065